The PWA Light Heavyweight Championship was a professional wrestling light heavyweight championship in Pro Wrestling America (PWA). It remained active until 1992 when the title was abandoned.

The inaugural champion was "Mr. Electricity" Steve Regal, the then reigning AWA World Junior Heavyweight Champion, who was billed as the first PWA Light Heavyweight Champion upon his arrival in the promotion in January 1985. Jerry Lynn holds the record for most reigns, with three. At an estimated 1,183 days, Tommy Ferrera's first reign is the longest in the title's history. Matt Derringer's second reign was the shortest in the history of the title lasting 8 days. Overall, there have been 12 reigns shared between 7 wrestlers, with four vacancies, and 1 deactivation.

Title history
Key

Reigns

List of combined reigns

Footnotes

References
General

Specific

External links
PWA Light Heavyweight Title at Cagewrestling.de

Light heavyweight wrestling championships